Goldonna is a village in Natchitoches Parish, Louisiana, United States. The population was 430 at the 2010 census.  It is part of the Natchitoches Micropolitan Statistical Area. South of Goldonna along Louisiana Highway 156, one may access Saline Bayou, popular for blackwater canoeing.

Geography

Demographics

2020 census

As of the 2020 United States census, there were 428 people, 146 households, and 90 families residing in the village.

2000 census
As of the census of 2000, there were 457 people, 163 households, and 131 families residing in the village. There were 192 housing units at an average density of 17.4 per square mile (6.7/km). The racial makeup of the village was 98.47% White, 0.66% Native American, 0.22% Pacific Islander, 0.22% from other races, and 0.44% from two or more races. Hispanic or Latino of any race were 0.44% of the population.

There were 163 households, out of which 39.3% had children under the age of 18 living with them, 63.8% were married couples living together, 10.4% had a female householder with no husband present, and 19.6% were non-families. 17.2% of all households were made up of individuals, and 11.7% had someone living alone who was 65 years of age or older. The average household size was 2.80 and the average family size was 3.15.

In the village, the population was spread out, with 28.9% under the age of 18, 11.4% from 18 to 24, 25.6% from 25 to 44, 24.3% from 45 to 64, and 9.8% who were 65 years of age or older. The median age was 31 years. For every 100 females, there were 101.3 males. For every 100 females age 18 and over, there were 94.6 males.

The median income for a household in the village was $27,500, and the median income for a family was $32,656. Males had a median income of $26,875 versus $17,000 for females. The per capita income for the village was $12,207. About 20.2% of families and 23.1% of the population were below the poverty line, including 17.7% of those under age 18 and 32.0% of those age 65 or over.

Government
The Mayor of Goldonna is Jennifer Garner Smith, a Republican. The three Aldermen are Norvel Garner (No Party), Fonda Garner (No Party), and Reed Franklin, Republican.

Education
The Goldonna Elementary/Junior High School serves pre-kindergarten through grade 8. Pupils come from as far away as the village of Ashland to the west, where the defunct Ashland High School was located.

Notable people
 Gordon Gunter, fisheries scientist
 Patricia Maxwell, romance novelist
 Riley J. Wilson, politician

Gallery

References

Villages in Natchitoches Parish, Louisiana
Villages in Louisiana
Populated places in Ark-La-Tex